The St. Augustine Free Public Library is the oldest library in Florida; opened in 1874 as a "subscription library." Located at 12 Aviles Street in St. Augustine, Florida, the building currently known as the Segui-Kirby Smith House still stands as a Research Library for the Saint Augustine Historical Society.

History
Housed in one of the oldest standing colonial buildings in Florida, the St. Augustine Free Public Library was once the residence of British Captain, Henry Skinner in 1769 as well as Confederate General Edmund Kirby Smith in 1887. 

St. Francis Inn property owner John L. Wilson and his wife Francis contributed to the formation of the public library system in St. Augustine after they purchased the Segui-Kirby Smith building on Aviles Street. They helped form the St. Augustine Library Association and gave the building to a private organization to be used as a free public library, where it remained from 1874 until the 1980s. 

When the St. Augustine Library Association was first formed on April 25th, 1874, no books of sectarian or political nature were to be purchased, but would be accepted if they were donated. Although there was no charge to borrow the books, library patrons gave money to help buy books for the library. Today, St. Augustine Historical Research Library is still open to the public at no cost, however, much of the material are one of a kind and rare and, therefore, must be used within the library.

References 

Buildings and structures in St. Augustine, Florida
Houses in St. Johns County, Florida
Spanish Colonial architecture in the United States
St. Augustine, Florida